Lung Leg were a Scottish indie band, formed in 1994 and disbanded in 1999. They were influenced by Post Punk, C86, riot grrrl and the Fire Engines.

History
Lung Leg formed in 1994 in Glasgow, Scotland, with a lineup of McKeown ("Jane Egypt") on bass and vocals, Annie Spandex and Maureen Quinn ("Mo Mo") on guitar and vocals, and Amanda Doorbar ("Jade Green") on drums. The quartet released The Negative Delinquent Autopsy (1994) and Shagg the Tiger (1995) EPs on the Piao! label; both were named "Single of the Week" by Melody Maker. The two EPs were later compiled together as the 1997 Hello Sir album on Kill Rock Stars.

Doorbar left in 1996, replaced by Todd Parmenter. This second lineup recorded their debut album, Maid to Minx, released in 1997 on the Vesuvius label. The lyrics for the title track were written by Danny Saunders (now of Correcto).

McKeown was also the drummer for labelmates Dick Johnson. When Quinn quit Lung Leg in 1997, they recruited her replacement, Philippa Smith, from Dick Johnson. This final lineup embarked on their sole tour of the US in 1998 with the Make-Up, and recorded two final singles, "Krayola" in 1998 and "Maid to Minx" (a new recording of the title track from the debut album) in 1999.

Lung Leg split after a final farewell gig in May 1999; a remixed and partially rerecorded version of their debut album was released posthumously that August on Southern Records.

Other projects
Jane McKeown later formed Peter Parker with Roz Davies (Josephine and Miss the Occupier), Jeremy Mills (Peeps into Fairyland, Idlewild) and Tori Firth. Releasing two seven inches on the Glasgow label, Say Dirty Records: Swallow the Rockets 2009 and Pretty Living 2010 which was a split single with Fire Engines Davy Henderson's new band, The Sexual Objects. Peter Parker also played two Marc Reilly sessions on BBC 6 music and performed at the Belle and Sebastian curated ATP Festival. Jane now performs with her band Spread Eagle which she formed with Jeremy Mills. Annie Spandex played bass for a bit before going on to form her own band, Normal Service.

Todd Parmenter went on to form The Beatings with Nicholas Pankhurst, Matthew Dawson & Dino Golnick, They released 4 singles and an album "Black Rays Defence" recorded and produced by My Bloody Valentines Kevin Shields. He also recorded 2 singles with The Beal and an album with Alex Kapranos.(unreleased)

Mo Quinn formed Nico's bike whose debut single "Sharkbait/Popnits" on Bubblegum records was a collapse board single of the week. She is currently playing/recording with new band 'The Misty' She has also recorded guitar and vocals for ex Sarah/Damaged Goods band Action Painting!'s debut LP

Members 
Former
 Jane "Jane Egypt" McKeown – vocals, bass (1994-1999)
 Annie Spandex – vocals, guitar,violin (1994-1999)
 Maureen "Mo Mo" Quinn – vocals, guitar (1994-1997)
 Amanda "Jade Green" Doorbar – vocals, drums (1994-1996)
 Todd Parmenter – vocals, drums (1996-1999)
 Philippa Smith – vocals, guitar (1997-1999)

Discography

Studio albums
 Maid to Minx (1997, Vesuvius; 1999, Southern Records)

Singles and EPs
 The Negative Delinquent Autopsy 7-inch EP (1994, Piao!)
 Shagg the Tiger 7-inch EP (1995, Piao!)
 "Right Now Baby" 7-inch single (1997, Vesuvius) 
 "Theme Park" 7-inch single (1997, Guided Missile) 
 "Club Beatroot Part Six" split 7-inch single with El Hombre Trajeado (1997, Flotsam & Jetsam) 
 "Krayola" split 7-inch single with the Make-Up (1998, Vesuvius/Southern Records) 
 "Maid to Minx" 7-inch single (1999, Southern Records)

Compilation albums
 Hello Sir (1997, Kill Rock Stars)

References

External links
Lung Leg Myspace

Scottish indie rock groups
Musical groups from Glasgow
Riot grrrl bands
Musical groups established in 1994
Underground punk scene in the United Kingdom
Musical groups disestablished in 1999
1994 establishments in Scotland